Barsisa, (“the man of priestly regalia”, from Aramaic bar, "son", and ṣīṣa, "gold plate", referring specifically to the high priest's breastplate) in Islamic mythology, was an ascetic who succumbed to the Devil's temptations and denied God. He had an enormous impact on the entire Muslim world, from Alexandria to Aleppo and Ḥaḍramawt.

The fable passed into European literary culture after its publication under the title "History of Santon Barsisa" in the British periodical "The Guardian" in 1713. Its anonymous contributor writes that he found the story in a volume of "Turkish Tales" and, worried that its Islamic origin may cause offense, explains that "the moral to be drawn from it is entirely Christian".  In this form the fable went on to inspire Matthew Gregory Lewis's 1796 Gothic novel The Monk.

See also
 Haya
 Zina

References

Resources
 Encyclopædia Britannica (15th ed.). Encyclopædia Britannica, Inc. 2010.
 Story of Barsisa the worshipper as narrated in Ibn al-Jawzi's Talbees Iblees
 

Islamic mythology
Satan